Wentworth Allen (30 January 1894 – 22 February 1943) was an Irish cricketer. He was a right-handed batsman and a right-arm medium pace bowler.

He played eight times for Ireland between 1920 and 1925, mostly against Scotland. All but one of those matches had first-class status. He also played a first-class match for Dublin University against Northamptonshire in 1926.

References
CricketEurope Stats Zone profile
Cricket Archive profile
Cricinfo profile

1894 births
1943 deaths
Irish cricketers
Dublin University cricketers
Cricketers from County Dublin